The Lunar New Year Cup, previously known as the Carlsberg Challenge or the Carlsberg Cup, is an annual invitational football tournament organised in Hong Kong by the Hong Kong Football Association (HKFA) since 1908. It is usually held on the first and the fourth day of the Lunar New Year as a part of the new year celebrations. The tournament was called the Carlsberg Cup from 1986 to 1989, from 1993 to 2006 as Carlsberg was the major sponsor of the event.

Since the 2007 edition of the event, the competition has officially been known as the "Lunar New Year Cup" by the Hong Kong Football Association. This is because Carlsberg is now no longer the major sponsor but a mere co-sponsor. During 2011 and 2012, the name of the event was changed to "Asian Challenge Cup".

History 
Initially, a touring team (usually European) visited Hong Kong playing exhibition matches vs local combined. In the period before and around the Second World War, the Lunar New Year Cup was competed for by teams from Hong Kong and mainland China. Since 1950, HKFA has invited at least one overseas team to enter the competition. Before 1982, there were three exhibition matches in the tournament. The first two were usually played by the Hong Kong national football team, Hong Kong player team and Hong Kong League XI while the Chinese XI played the last match.

In 1983, there was a main sponsorship for the competition for the first time and the number of invited teams was increased to three. From 1993 onwards, national teams rather than club teams were invited to participate in the competition. Many of the matches in that period were recognised as "full internationals" by FIFA.

Competition name and sponsorship

Results 

Notes

References

External links
 Lunar New Year Cup results RSSSF
 HKFA Website 漫談賀歲足球賽事(一) (in Chinese)

 
International association football competitions hosted by Hong Kong